Angela Ranft (born 7 December 1969) is a German former cyclist. She competed in the women's individual road race at the 1988 Summer Olympics.

References

External links
 

1969 births
Living people
German female cyclists
Olympic cyclists of East Germany
Cyclists at the 1988 Summer Olympics
People from Weißwasser
Cyclists from Saxony
East German female cyclists
People from Bezirk Cottbus